Keller Easterling is an American architect, urbanist, writer, and professor. She is Enid Storm Dwyer Professor and Director of the MED Program at Yale University.

Biography
She earned both her B.A. and M.Arch from Princeton University School of Architecture and has taught architectural design and history at Parsons The New School for Design, Pratt Institute, and Columbia University. She is Enid Storm Dwyer Professor of Architecture and director of the MED program at Yale University. Easterling is a contemporary writer working on the issues of urbanism, architecture, and organization in relation to globalization.

Easterling is a 2019 United States Artist in Architecture and Design, the 2019 recipient of the Blueprint Award for Critical Thinking, and the 2018 recipient of the Schelling Architecture Foundation Theory Award.

Seeking "complications rather than solutions", Easterling's book Medium Design: Knowing How to Work on the World (2021) "rethinks ways of addressing the planet's most intractable problems." Easterling's Extrastatecraft: The Power of Infrastructure Space (2014) analyzes infrastructure as the determinant of a set of hidden rules that "structure the spaces all around us." Easterling's We Will Be Making Active Form talks about the relationship between human scripts and technology and the idea of human scripts being activities transformed technology deliver "new capacities to enhance the activities of humans". Enduring Innocence: Global Architecture and Its Political Masquerades (2005), researches familiar spatial products that have landed in precarious political situations around the world. A previous book, Organization Space: Landscapes, Highways and Houses in America, applies network theory to a discussion of American infrastructure and development formats. Easterling is also the author (with archivist, writer, and filmmaker Rick Prelinger) of Call It Home: The House That Private Enterprise Built, a laserdisc on the history of suburbia and suburban planning. She has completed two research installations on the Web that explore alternative methods and documents for adjusting urban space: "Wildcards: A Game of Orgman" and "Highline: Plotting NYC." Her work has been published in journals such as Grey Room, Volume, Cabinet, Assemblage, Log, Praxis, Harvard Design Magazine, Perspecta, Metalocus, and ANY. She has lectured in the United States as well as internationally and her work has been exhibited at venues such as the Queens Museum of Art, Storefront for Art and Architecture, and the 2014 and 2018 Venice Biennales.

In spring 2008 she was one of 100 designers chosen by Swiss architects Jacques Herzog and Pierre de Meuron to receive a commission for a villa project organized by the Chinese artist Ai Wei Wei in Ordos, Inner Mongolia.

She presented the academic paper "Subtraction" in the workshop 'Mine the city – With logistics to circular metabolisms' at the 3rd International Holcim Forum 2010 in Mexico City.

"Take-Away" by Easterling talks about the influence of money on houses and her argument that houses are not money. One of the arguments in the article are "Mortgages fix the house as a marker for debt and its auxiliary economic instruments are limited". When it comes to currencies and other money-related terms, Easterling mentions that currencies tend to be bought and sold very quickly as well as make boundary against loss. However, houses are expected to be both "volatile and stable".

Publications

Books
Seaside: Making a Town In America. Princeton Architectural Press. New York, N.Y.: Princeton Architectural Press, 1991. By David Mohney and Easterling. .
American Town Plans: A Comparative Time Line. New York, N.Y.: Princeton Architectural Press, 1993.
Organization Space: Landscapes, Highways, and Houses in America. Cambridge, Massachusetts: MIT Press, 1999.
Enduring Innocence: Global Architecture and its Political Masquerades. Cambridge, Massachusetts: MIT Press, 2005. '
The Action Is The Form. Victor Hugo's TED Talk. London: Strelka, 2012. ASIN B0085JSC44
Extrastatecraft: The Power of Infrastructure Space. Verso, 2014. 
Subtraction. Sternberg Press / Critical Spatial Practice, 2014 
Medium Design: Knowing How to Work on the World. Verso, 2021.

Papers
"With Satellites: Dubai + India." AD: Architectural Design 75, no. 6 (2005): 64–69.
"Some True Stories." Perspecta, vol. 42, MIT Press, 2010, pp. 75–77.
"Extrastatecraft." Perspecta, vol. 39, MIT Press, 2007, pp. 4–16.
"Take-Away." Perspecta, vol. 45, MIT Press, 2012, pp. 153–60.
"Take-Away." Perspecta 45 (2012): 153–160.

Exhibitions 

 2014, Venice Biennale with OMA/AMO, Floor, Central Pavilion Elements Exhibition.
 2015, Subtraction Games Lux Projection on Beinecke Library with Lisa Albaugh and Samantha Jaff, April 10, Beinecke Library, New Haven, Connecticut
 2016, Gift City, Test Site, Henry Art Gallery, Seattle, Washington.
 2016, You Won't Be Able To Do It, Istanbul Design Biennale, October.
 2018, MANY, US Pavilion, 2018 Venice Architecture Biennale, May.
 2019, MANY, Wrightwood 659, Chicago, February.
 2019, Seoul Biennale for Architecture and Urbanism, September.

References

External links
Easterling's personal site
Archinect Interview with Keller Easterling
Wildcards: A Game of Orgman

1959 births
Living people
21st-century American architects
Princeton University School of Architecture alumni
Pratt Institute faculty
Columbia University faculty
Yale School of Architecture faculty
American women architects
American women academics
21st-century American women